Mauricio Kleyff (March 14, 1931 – March 23, 2010) was a Mexican screenwriter best known for writing the scripts of the television programs El show de los Polivoces and Los Beverly de Peralvillo.

References

External links

Mexican screenwriters
1931 births
2010 deaths
Mexican Jews
Mexican people of Polish-Jewish descent
People from Mexico City